John Waerig (born 1976) is a former American football tight end. He played college football at Wisconsin and Maryland. He was a member of the Detroit Lions during the 2001 NFL season. He also played for the Barcelona Dragons and Amsterdam Admirals of NFL Europe in 2001.

References

Players of American football from Philadelphia
Detroit Lions players
American football tight ends
Wisconsin Badgers football players
Maryland Terrapins football players
1976 births
Living people
Amsterdam Admirals players
Barcelona Dragons players